Sheikh Saif bin Hamad Al Sharqi was the Sheikh of Fujairah from 1936–1938 and head of the Sharqiyin tribe.

Nominally a dependency of Sharjah, then Abu Dhabi, Fujairah was effectively independent following a number of conflicts, not least of which were with its neighbours, the Sharjah dependencies of Kalba and Khor Fakkan.

Sheikh Said bin Hamad took over from his long-lived and strong father Hamad Al Sharqi, who had fought all his life for independence for Fujairah from Sharjah and for British recognition of Fujairah as a Trucial State in its own right. That dream would come true for his younger brother, Mohammed bin Hamad, who acceded in 1938 or 1939 on Saif's death.

Notes

References 

Sheikhs of the Emirate of Fujairah
History of the United Arab Emirates
20th-century Arabs